Iconisma is a genus of moths in the family Blastobasidae.

Species
 Iconisma macrocera Walsingham, 1897

Former species
 Iconisma rosmarinella Walsingham, 1901

References

Blastobasidae genera